Zvirgzdene Parish is an administrative unit of Ludza Municipality in the Latgale region of Latvia.

Towns, villages and settlements of Zvirgzdene parish 

Parishes of Latvia
Ludza Municipality
Latgale